The 1993 Canisius Golden Griffins football team represented Canisius College in the 1993 NCAA Division I-AA football season. The Golden Griffins offense scored 186 points while the defense allowed 165 points.

Schedule

References

Canisius
Canisius Golden Griffins football seasons
Canisius Golden Griffins football